Drake Equation is a 2001 (see 2001 in music) album by the band Tub Ring. It was produced by Mr. Bungle guitarist Trey Spruance.

Reception

Track listing
"Where's the Robot?" – 1:12
"Bite the Wax Tadpole" – 5:06
"Faster" – 3:44
"Good Food: Happy Family" – 4:03
"Bernard's Three Awakenings" – 1:59
"Numbers" – 4:59
"Downloading Satan" – 1:33
"In the Future" – 3:58
"No More Refills" – 4:23
"She's the Pro" – 3:00
"God Hates Astronauts"  – 5:18
"(hidden track)" – 5:06

All songs written by Tub Ring

Personnel 

Kevin Gibson - vocals
Rob Kleiner - keyboards
Jason Fields - bass
Mike Gilmore - drums
Mouse - guitar
Dave Weiner - trumpet, backup vocals
Dave Smith - saxophone, backup vocals
Trey Spruance - additional guitars, keyboards, vocals & sleigh bells; producer, mixer
Randy Herman - additional keyboards
Mia Park - backup vocals
Turon Yon - engineer
Mike Casey - second engineer
Rick Barnes - assistant engineer
Chris Bauer - assistant engineer
Josh Lopatin - assistant engineer
Dan Steinman - assistant engineer for mixing
George Horn - mastering
Adam Bedore - album layout & design
Jason Fields - album layout & design

References

Tub Ring albums
2001 albums
Albums produced by Trey Spruance